QUB may refer to:

 Huallaga Quechua, a Quechuan language with ISO 639-3 code qub.
 Quarry Bay station, Hong Kong (MTR station code).
 Queen's University Belfast, a public research university in Belfast.
 Ubari Airport, a Libyan airport with IATA airport code QUB.